Integrin alpha M (ITGAM) is one protein subunit that forms heterodimeric integrin alpha-M beta-2 (αMβ2) molecule, also known as macrophage-1 antigen (Mac-1) or complement receptor 3 (CR3). ITGAM is also known as CR3A, and cluster of differentiation molecule 11B (CD11B).  The second chain of αMβ2 is the common integrin β2 subunit known as CD18, and integrin αMβ2 thus belongs to the β2 subfamily (or leukocyte) integrins.

αMβ2 is expressed on the surface of many leukocytes involved in the innate immune system, including monocytes, granulocytes, macrophages, and natural killer cells  and subsets of T and B cells. It mediates inflammation by regulating leukocyte adhesion and migration and has been implicated in several immune processes such as phagocytosis, cell-mediated cytotoxicity, chemotaxis and cellular activation. It is involved in the complement system due to its capacity to bind inactivated complement component 3b (iC3b). The ITGAM (alpha) subunit of integrin αMβ2 is directly involved in  causing the adhesion and spreading of cells but cannot mediate cellular migration without the presence of the β2 (CD18) subunit.

In genomewide association studies, single nucleotide polymorphisms in ITGAM had the strongest association with systemic lupus erythematosus, with an odds ratio of 1.65 for the T allele of rs9888739 and lupus.

In histopathology, immunohistochemistry with antibodies against CD11B is frequently used to identify macrophages and microglia.

Function of CD11b 
CD11b, as an integrin molecule on the surface of leukocytes, plays an important role in cell migration, adhesion, and transmigration across blood vessels, because it can bind to components of extracellular matrix and intracellular adhesion molecules (ICAMs) on the endothelial surface. This process is important for leukocyte recruitment into the site of inflammation. 

Moreover, there are other important processes with CD11b involvement, more precisely Mac-1 integrin involvement as a whole. One of which is phagocytosis of opsonised particles by a complement component iC3b. Such opsonised particles could be bacteria, apoptotic cells, and even immune complexes. CD11b binding to iC3b leads to a production of anti-inflammatory cytokines, e.g., interleukin 10 (IL-10) and tumour growth factor beta (TGFβ). This process is important for regulation of the inflammatory milieu. 

CD11b is also involved in the differentiation of osteoclasts, bone remodelling cells. Mac-1 is expressed in osteoclast progenitors, and it seems that it is a part of a negative feedback of osteoclastogenesis.  CD11b also modulates other functions of leukocytes, e.g. oxidative burst, apoptosis, binding of fibrinogen etc.  

On circulating leukocytes, CD11b is expressed in a closed conformation. The switch into an active conformation follows quickly after the stimulation of toll-like receptors (TLR) of the leukocytes.  Once activated, CD11b can bind its ligands with high affinity, e.g., binding of ICAM-1 or ICAM-2 molecules on endothelium and subsequent adhesion. CD11b signalling is also known to interfere with TLR signalling in the cell. TLR stimulation results in the production of pro-inflammatory cytokines, e.g., IL-6 and IL-1β, via a series of phosphorylation of signalling factors, one of which is the NF-κB transcription factor.  This signalling is in fact negatively affected by CD11b signalling. Consequently, this leads to a reduced activation of NF-κB and lower production of above-mentioned pro-inflammatory cytokines. To conclude, CD11b signalling negatively regulates leukocyte activation after TLR stimulation.  Beside TLR signalling, CD11b also negatively regulates B cell receptor (BCR) signalling, and it supresses T cell activation and dendritic cell maturation and function.

Therapeutic significance of CD11b 
Regarding CD11b function, it is apparent that it plays an important role in immune cell regulation. Once this regulation is disrupted, it may lead to a higher susceptibility to inflammatory and autoimmune diseases. Some examples would be systemic lupus erythematosus (SLE), lupus nephritis and certain types of cancer.

Systemic Lupus Erythematosus 
Genome Wide Association Studies helped to uncover 3 main single nucleotide polymorphisms (SNPs) in CD11b, that are associated with the risk of developing SLE, cardiovascular disease, and lupus nephritis (a complication usually occurring along with SLE). These SNPs are: rs1143679 (R77H), rs1143678 (P1146S), and rs1143683 (A858V) and they result in the lower ability of CD11b to properly bind ICAM-1 and iC3b, thus decreased cell adhesion and phagocytosis. Reduced ability to negatively regulate the production of pro-inflammatory cytokines IL-6, IL-1β, and tumour necrosis factor α (TNFα) after TLR stimulation have been also observed in these mutations. 

CD11b plays a protective role during SLE and lupus nephritis owing to its anti-inflammatory properties. Lupus nephritis is characterised by the accumulation of immune complexes in kidneys and overall immune infiltration into kidneys, which results in renal damage. This debilitating complication of SLE is associated with the above-mentioned mutations in CD11b. Patients with ITGAM SNPs have higher serum levels of interferon type I (IFN-I), which is one of the risk factors for developing SLE and lupus nephritis. Moreover, higher levels of other pro-inflammatory cytokines IL-6, IL-1β and TNFα after TLR stimulation, observed in patients with ITGAM SNPs, further drive the inflammation during this disease causing more tissue damage and creation of immune complexes. 

Hence, CD11b represents a possible therapeutic target for the treatment of SLE. Indeed, many attempts to target CD11b have been made. Firstly, antibody-based therapy which proved to be ineffective in the case of CD11b.  However, other therapies using small allosteric CD11b agonists seem to be a promising tool as their activation of CD11b leads to a regulation of TLR-dependant pro-inflammatory pathways and protection from renal damage.

Tumours 
CD11b seems to be a potent player in managing certain types of solid tumours. Even though nowadays many tools for cancer treatment exist, multiple factors of this illness remain a challenging topic. One of them are myeloid-derived suppressor cells (MDSC) and tumour-associated macrophages (TAMs), which are myeloid cells present in the tumour microenvironment possessing suppressor properties, thus favouring the tumour growth. TAMs, however, do not have only tumour-promoting properties, they can also display tumour-inhibiting properties. It depends on their stimulation. The tumour-inhibiting properties include the production of pro-inflammatory cytokines and the ability to present antigens. 

Using CD11b agonists seems to be of importance in tumour treatment. Agonist that stabilize CD11b in its active conformation result in higher adhesion of CD11b to its endothelial ligands, consequently impair the ability of transendothelial migration to the site of inflammation. Such agonist therapy is under development and one promising candidate, GB1275, is currently in its first clinical phase at the beginning of 2023. This agonist of CD11b shows impaired transmigration of suppressive TAMs into the site of tumour and modulation of TAMs towards pro-inflammatory phenotype with higher antigen presentation and production of pro-inflammatory cytokines. Therefore, promising better tumour inhibition.

See also 
 integrin

References

Further reading

External links 
 
 Mouse CD Antigen Chart
 Human CD Antigen Chart
ITGAM Info with links in the Cell Migration Gateway 

Integrins